The 2014 Sunshine Ladies Tour was the inaugural season of the Sunshine Ladies Tour, a series of professional golf tournaments for women based in  South Africa.

The season featured six 36-holes stroke play tournaments with no cut, each with a purse of R100,000. The leading players on the Order of Merit competed for Investec Cup for Ladies in March, with a purse of R300,000.

Schedule
The season consisted of 10 events, nine in South Africa and one in Zambia, played between April 2013 and March 2014.

Order of Merit
This shows the leaders in the final Order of Merit.

References

External links
Official homepage of the Sunshine Ladies Tour

Sunshine Ladies Tour
Sunshine Ladies Tour